Lakhandur is a City and headquarter of Lakhandur Taluka in Bhandara district of Maharashtra, India.  It is connected with National Highway NH-353C.It was Vidhan Sabha Constituency till 2009. It is located in vidharbha region of Maharashtra.It is located on bank of chulbandh river.

Demographics
As at the 2011 census, the population was 9231; 4659 males and 4572 females, giving a sex ration of 981, higher than the state average of 929 .  There were 1012 children aged 0–6 = 10.96% of the total population. The literacy rate was 84.46% (males 89.71% females 79.16%) higher than the state average of 82.34%.

Educational facilities 
 Dr. Babasaheb Ambedkar vidyalaya
 Shivaji vidyalaya
 Siddhartha Jr college
 Y. C. college
 Z. P. High School

References

Cities and towns in Bhandara district
Talukas in Maharashtra